George Malki Soumi (born 1943) is a Syrian government appointee, who served as the Minister of Irrigation of Syria. He is an expert in irrigation and land reclamation.

Early life, education and career
Soumi was born in Qamishli in 1943. He earned a PhD. in Technical Sciences in the field of irrigation and land reclamation at the Moscow Scientific Research Institute of Hydrotechnics and Land Reclamation in 1975.

Director of Irrigation and Water Use Directorate at the Ministry of Agriculture, 1986-2003 
Member of the Board of Trustees of the International Center for Agricultural Research in the Dry Areas (ICARDA) 
Head of the Arab Team for Rationalization of Water Use in Arab Agriculture of the Arab Organization for Agricultural Development 
Expert at the UN in the field of Integrated Management of Water Resources 
Expert at the State Planning Commission 
Worked with the International Fund for Agricultural Development on water situation in the Northeastern region 
Worked as consultant at the Irrigation Committee at the People's Assembly 
Has over 265 publications in the field of water research

Personal life
Soumi is married and has a son Marvin and two daughters Marina and Georgette.

See also
Cabinet of Syria

References

Minister of Irrigation George Malki Soumi, SANA
Biography of the new Syrian government 2011 - the names and lives of government ministers, Syria FM, 17 April 2011

External links
Ministry of Irrigation official government website
Presidential Decree Appointing Ismat As Minister of Culture, Soumi Minister of Irrigation, SANA, 4 October 2010
Water Crisis a Major Factor in Syria Unrest, OOSKA News, 5 April 2011

1943 births
Living people
Syrian ministers of irrigation
Arab Socialist Ba'ath Party – Syria Region politicians